Diamond Tongues is a 2015 Canadian comedy-drama film directed by Pavan Moondi and Brian Robertson. It stars July Talk band-member Leah Fay Goldstein as a struggling actress who descends into a downward spiral of depression, narcissism and cruelty.

The film premiered at the Slamdance Film Festival in Park City, Utah on January 25, 2015, and was acquired by Mongrel Media for distribution in Canada and by Factory 25 for the United States. It had a limited theatrical release in Canada on August 7, 2015.

Cast

Release

Critical reception 
On review aggregation website Rotten Tomatoes, the film holds an approval rating of 100% based on 11 reviews, and an average rating of 7.8/10. On Metacritic, the film has a weighted average score of 75 out of 100, based on 7 critics, indicating "generally favorable reviews".

NOW Magazine's Norman Wilner calls the script "sharp and thoughtful." The Hollywood Reporter's Frank Scheck praises the film as "a vivid depiction of the city's arts scene," adding, "with the soundtrack consisting of songs by such indie rock bands as Islands and Broken Social Scene adding greatly to the overall atmosphere."

Accolades 
Goldstein was nominated for Best Actress at the 4th Canadian Screen Awards, held on March 13, 2016.

References

External links 

2015 films
Canadian drama films
English-language Canadian films
2015 drama films
2010s English-language films
2010s Canadian films